The 1943 Bowling Green Falcons football team was an American football team that represented Bowling Green State College (later renamed Bowling Green State University) as an independent during the 1943 college football season. In its third season under head coach Robert Whittaker, the team compiled a 5–3–1 record and outscored opponents by a total of 194 to 104. Wayne Bordner was the team captain. The team played its home games at University Stadium in Bowling Green, Ohio.

Schedule

References

Bowling Green
Bowling Green Falcons football seasons
Bowling Green Falcons football